St Matthew's Collegiate School is a state-integrated Anglican girls' secondary school in Pownall Street, Masterton, New Zealand.

Notable alumni

 Julie Paama-Pengelly (born 1964), tā moko artist, painter, commentator, and curator
 Katrina Shanks (born 1969), former politician
 Lydia Wevers (1950–2021), literary critic, English language literary historian, editor, and book reviewer

References

Girls' schools in New Zealand
Educational institutions established in 1914
Masterton
Secondary schools in the Wellington Region
Schools in the Wairarapa
Anglican schools in New Zealand
1914 establishments in New Zealand
Alliance of Girls' Schools Australasia